Seng Guan Ssu is a prominent Buddhist edifice on Narra Street, near Divisoria, in Tondo, Manila, Philippines. It contains a stupa, a huge repository for urns of human ashes, several meditation rooms, and various shrines.  It is a major cultural center for the Chinese Filipino community. It is a Chan Buddhist temple built by the father of Buddhism in the Philippines, Master Xing Yuan from the South Putuo Temple in Xiamen, Fujian Province.

Seng Guan Ssu was established by Wu Jianglu, Wang Zhenwen, and members of their Chinese Buddhist Society in the Philippines.  It is regarded as the first Buddhist temple in the Philippines, being the first temple with a resident monk, Venerable Seng Guan (1889-1962), after whom the temple was named.  Seng Guan from Fu Kien (Fujian), China, was active in teaching and organizing work in Southern China, Manila, and Rizal.  His work laid the foundations for several institutions, including the Samantabhadra Institute in Santa Cruz, Manila, and the Hwa Chong Buddhist Temple complex in Tugatog, Malabon, Rizal (now Malabon, Metro Manila), where his ashes are enshrined in a stupa.

In 1960, the Seng Guan Ssu set up the Philippine Academy of Sakya, Manila.  Over the years, Seng Guan Ssu also conducted many charity works for the poor, orphans, elderly, refugees, and government welfare projects.

References

Buddhist temples in Metro Manila
Buildings and structures in Tondo, Manila
Chinese-Filipino culture
20th-century Buddhist temples
20th-century religious buildings and structures in the Philippines